The 1854 Cardiganshire by-election was a parliamentary by-election held on 22 February 1854 for the British House of Commons constituency of Cardiganshire.

Previous Member of Parliament
The seat had become vacant when the constituency's Conservative Member of Parliament (MP), William Edward Powell (16 February 1788 – 10 April 1854) retired from Parliament. He died not long after.

Candidates
Only one candidate nominated for the by-election.

 Ernest Vaughan (30 October 1800 – 8 November 1873).

Vaughan was a prominent landowner in Cardiganshire and the 4th Earl of Lisburne.

Vaughan's political views and allegiance to the Conservative Party were expected to attract opposition and Thomas Lloyd of Bronwydd was mentioned as a possible candidate. However, Lloyd declined to stand and the Liberals, following the lead of the Pryse family of Gogerddan, chose not to contest the seat.

Previous result

Results

See also
 Cardiganshire constituency
 List of United Kingdom by-elections (1847–1857)

References

 British Parliamentary Election Results 1832-1885, compiled and edited by F.W.S. Craig (Macmillan Press 1977)

Further reading 
 
A Vision Of Britain Through Time (Constituency elector numbers)

1854 elections in the United Kingdom
1854 in Wales
1850s elections in Wales
By-elections to the Parliament of the United Kingdom in Welsh constituencies
History of Ceredigion
19th century in Ceredigion